The Corre was a multinational villainous stable that wrestled on World Wrestling Entertainment/WWE's SmackDown brand in 2011. The group was a spinoff of British wrestler Wade Barrett's previous stable, The Nexus.

The stable was formed after American wrestler Heath Slater, South African Justin Gabriel and Wade Barrett left The Nexus and allied with Guyanese wrestler Ezekiel Jackson.

History

Formation 
After Wade Barrett was kicked out of The Nexus by new leader CM Punk, he moved from Raw to SmackDown. While under CM Punk, Heath Slater and Justin Gabriel refused to perform their initiation to stay in the group and left The Nexus. On the January 14 episode of SmackDown, Gabriel and Slater interfered during Barrett's match with Big Show, attacking Show. They were joined by Ezekiel Jackson who continued the attack by performing a body slam on Big Show. Big Show continued to feud with the group throughout its existence and on the January 21 episode of SmackDown, the group named themselves The Corre, while also announcing that The Corre would be leaderless as all the members were equals. They all competed in the Royal Rumble on January 30, but were all eliminated by different wrestlers (in order: Gabriel by Daniel Bryan, Slater by John Cena, Jackson by Kane, and Barrett by Randy Orton) with Jackson eliminating Big Show and Barrett eliminating Rey Mysterio and Diesel, and making it to the final four.

Championship wins 
Throughout its tenure, the Corre often employed interference during matches and frequent post-match attacks. Tensions between the members of The Corre and The Nexus led to two brawls between the groups on Raw and before the Royal Rumble match. At Elimination Chamber on February 20, Gabriel and Slater became the first to gain a championship within The Corre, as they won the WWE Tag Team Championship by defeating Santino Marella and Vladimir Kozlov. This began Gabriel and Slater's second reign as WWE Tag Team Champions after their first reign as part of The Nexus. At the same event, Barrett received his first opportunity at the World Heavyweight Championship when he took part in the SmackDown Elimination Chamber match, but failed to win the championship when being eliminated by The Corre's nemesis, Big Show. The following night on Raw, Gabriel and Slater lost the championship to John Cena and WWE Champion The Miz. However, Gabriel and Slater immediately invoked their rematch clause and won the rematch and the championship to start their third reign as WWE Tag Team Champions. On the March 25 episode of SmackDown, Barrett added to The Corre another championship when he defeated Kofi Kingston to win his first singles title, the Intercontinental Championship.

Downturn and breakup 

Things took a turn for the worse for The Corre when the group was soundly beaten at WrestleMania XXVII in an eight-man tag team match against Big Show, Kane, Kofi Kingston, and Santino Marella in under two minutes. The following night on Raw, hoping to make a statement, The Corre attacked John Cena and The Rock, but the duo overwhelmed them. On the April 22 episode of SmackDown, The Corre endured further misery when Big Show and Kane won the championship from Gabriel and Slater. The Corre failed to regain the tag team titles despite Gabriel and Slater, as well as Barrett and Jackson challenging Big Show and Kane on the April 29 episode of SmackDown and at Extreme Rules on May 1, respectively. Tensions within the group began to flare due to failed interference in each other's matches. On the May 6 episode of SmackDown, Jackson refused to celebrate with the rest of The Corre when he defeated Big Show, instead choosing to walk out on them after his match, thus leading to Barrett, Gabriel and Slater attacking him backstage and removing him from the group. This started a feud between Barrett and Jackson, who challenged Barrett for the Intercontinental Championship twice, but failed to win the title since he won the bouts on May 22 at Over the Limit by disqualification and on the June 3 episode of SmackDown by countout instead of a pinfall or a submission. On the June 10 episode of SmackDown, Barrett, fleeing from Jackson, walked out on Gabriel and Slater in a six-man tag team match against Jackson and The Usos (Jey and Jimmy Uso), leaving them handicapped and causing them to lose the match, after which Gabriel and Slater confronted Barrett and declared the dissolution of the faction, and The Corre was no more.

Championships and accomplishments 
 World Wrestling Entertainment
 WWE Intercontinental Championship (1 time) – Barrett
 WWE Tag Team Championship (2 times) – Slater and Gabriel

See also 
 The Nexus (professional wrestling)

References 

WWE teams and stables